Strangers When We Meet is a 1960 American drama film about two married neighbors who have an affair. The movie was adapted by Evan Hunter from his novel of the same name and directed by Richard Quine. The film stars Kirk Douglas, Kim Novak, Ernie Kovacs, Barbara Rush, and Walter Matthau.

The picture was filmed in Los Angeles, with scenes shot in Beverly Hills, Brentwood, Bel Air, Santa Monica, and Malibu.

Plot
Larry Coe is a Los Angeles architect who is married with two kids. He has a very bright wife, Eve. She is ambitious for him, but he wants to do work more imaginative than the commercial buildings he's been designing. He meets with Roger Altar, an author, to discuss building a house that will be an "experiment" and something Coe wants to do more of, something original.

Maggie Gault is one of his neighbors whose son is friends with his. She tells Larry she has seen some of his previous houses and thinks that the more unconventional houses are the best.  This encouragement is what he needs from his wife but hasn't been able to get.

Both Larry and Maggie grow dissatisfied in their marriages. Larry's wife is too hard-headed and practical and Maggie's husband isn't interested in having sex with her. So they have an affair that involves meeting in secret. They both know what they're doing is wrong, and they are devoted to their children.

Felix Anders is a neighbor who snoops around and finds out about their affair. His leering and insinuations make Larry realize the risks he's taking. He tells Maggie that they shouldn't see each other for a while. Felix, in the meantime, makes a play for Larry's wife. In a way, Felix is a personification of the tawdriness of Larry and Maggie's affair.

Eve has no interest in Felix's advances and rejects him in dramatic fashion. In the aftermath she wises up to the fact that Larry has been unfaithful. After confronting him, they agree to stay together and move to Hawaii, where Larry has been offered a job to design a city.

Altar's house is finished but still empty. After Larry phones her, Maggie makes one last appointment to meet him at the newly completed home. Maggie drives up to take a look at it. Larry shows up and they talk about how they can never be together. Larry wishes he and Maggie could live in the house and if they did, he would dig a moat around it and never leave it. Maggie says she loves him.

The contractor for the house shows up and thinks Maggie is Larry's wife. They both take a moment to savor the irony of his remark and Maggie drives away.

Cast

 Kirk Douglas as Larry Coe
 Kim Novak as Margaret Gault
 Ernie Kovacs as Roger Altar
 Barbara Rush as Eve Coe
 Walter Matthau as Felix Anders
 Virginia Bruce as Mrs. Wagner
 Kent Smith as Stanley Baxter
 Helen Gallagher as Betty Anders
 John Bryant as Ken Gault
 Sue Ane Langdon as Daphne
 Nancy Kovack as Marcia

Production
Art director Ross Bellah elected to have a real house built for the one Larry Coe is designing for Roger Altar in the film. Bellah, with architect Carl Anderson, designed an all-wood 3,800-square-foot house and had it built on a hillside lot in Bel Air. The filming schedule had to be closely aligned with the house's construction schedule because the house was an important element of the plot, and scenes had to be filmed at various stages of construction. The house, at 930 Chantilly Road, Los Angeles, still stands today.

Reception
Variety said that the film is "...easy on the eyes but hard on the intellect...an old-fashioned soap opera", and: "It is a rather pointless, slow-moving story, but it has been brought to the screen with such skill that it charms the spectator into an attitude of relaxed enjoyment, much the same effect as that produced by a casual daydream fantasy". Time magazine called the movie: "pure tripe". "Unvaried strangulated hush", is how film critic Stanley Kauffmann, in The New Republic, described Novak's diction. Craig Butler at Allmovie says that Douglas "seems a little out of place", and that the screenplay is "predictable".

See also
 List of American films of 1960

References

External links

Tonguette, Peter. - Strangers When We Meet. - The Film Journal
Strangers When We Meet at Trailers from Hell

1960 films
1960 drama films

Adultery in films
American drama films
Columbia Pictures films
1960s English-language films
Films about architecture
Films based on American novels
Films directed by Richard Quine
Films scored by George Duning
Films set in Los Angeles
Films with screenplays by Evan Hunter
Bryna Productions films
1960s American films